

Events

January events
 January 1 – Bangor and Aroostook Railroad begins rail service connecting Aroostook County, Maine to the United States rail network.

April events
 April 29 – The Lake Street Elevated Railroad in Chicago is extended west from California & Lake to Laramie (52nd) Avenue.

May events
 May 11 – 3,000 employees of the Pullman Palace Car Company go on strike to protest lowered wages without an equivalent reduction in expenses charged in the company town, Pullman, Illinois (a suburb of Chicago).

July events 
 July 7 – The Wichita Falls Railway, a predecessor of the Missouri–Kansas–Texas Railroad, is incorporated in Texas.
 July 15 – Central Pacific Railroad scraps El Gobernador, at the time the largest locomotive in the world.

August events 
 August 4 – The Denver, Leadville and Gunnison Railway in Colorado, which purchased the Denver, South Park and Pacific Railroad five years earlier, enters receivership.
 August 7 – The West Highland Railway, operated by the North British Railway, is publicly opened to Fort William, Scotland.
 August 27 – Pontiac Pacific Junction Railway opens the segment between Fort-Coulonge and Waltham, Quebec, a line segment that was completed in February 1888.

October events 
 October – Mur Valley Railway opens in Austria with the first class U 0-6-2T.

November events
 November – Eben B. Thomas succeeds John King as president of the Erie Railroad.
 November 7 – The Southern Pacific Railroad inaugurates the Sunset Express passenger train between New Orleans and San Francisco.

December events
 December 22 – The Chelford rail accident in England kills 14.

Unknown date events
 The Southern Railway is formed from the combination of the Richmond and Danville Railroad system and the East Tennessee, Virginia and Georgia Railroad.
 Stearns Manufacturing Company of Erie, Pennsylvania, starts manufacturing Heisler locomotives.
 Oliver Robert Hawke Bury moves from the Chief mechanical engineer position at the Great Western Railway of Brazil to the same position at the Entre Ríos Railway in Argentina.
 Construction of first oil-engined locomotive, an experimental unit designed by William Dent Priestman and built by his company, Priestman Brothers of Hull, England.

Births

Deaths
 March 2 – William H. Osborn, president of Illinois Central Railroad 1855–1865, president of Chicago, St. Louis and New Orleans Railroad 1875–1882, dies (b. 1820).
 September 1 – Robert Pearson Brereton, chief assistant to Isambard Kingdom Brunel who completed many engineering projects after Brunel's death in 1859 (b. 1818).

References
 (January 16, 2005), Biographies of chairmen, managers & other senior officers. Retrieved February 10, 2005.